The Daren Sammy Cricket Ground, previously the Beausejour Cricket Ground, is a cricket ground located near Gros Islet, Saint Lucia standard seating capacity of 15,000. It was completed in 2002 and currently accommodates 13,000 spectators.

Originally named after the Beausejour hills and situated in the outskirts of Rodney Bay, the stadium was completed in 2002 and hosts domestic matches for the Windward Islands cricket team. It staged its first international Test match in 2003 against Sri Lanka and became the first venue in the Caribbean to host a day-night game.

The sporting facility was constructed on 22 acres consisting of about 18 hospitality suites and a pavilion that offers each team its own gym and lounge apart from a balcony and conference room. It is located in the driest area of Saint Lucia, making it most suitable for hosting cricket.

On 21 July 2016, it was formally renamed the Daren Sammy Cricket Ground after Daren Sammy who captained the West Indies side in winning the 2016 ICC World Twenty20 in India. He also captained the West Indies to victory in the 2012 ICC World Twenty20 in Sri Lanka, making him the second West Indian captain after Clive Lloyd with multiple ICC world championships. One of the stands will also be named in honour of Johnson Charles, who was also part of the side in both 2012 and 2016.

The first international match played at the renamed ground took place on 9 August 2016, when India played the West Indies as part of a four-match Test series.

Location
The cricket ground is located at the north-eastern end of the tourist resort of Rodney Bay, approximately 6 minutes drive from the town of Gros Islet on the scenic Castries-Gros Islet Highway. The stadium is close to the residential enclaves in Beauséjour and Epouge Bay.

Facilities

The cricket ground is known for its high standard facilities and is regarded by the West Indies Cricket Board as a standard for current and future venues in the Caribbean. Its outfield, a perfect oval, is predictably lush green. It also became the first international ground in the Caribbean to receive floodlighting with the installation of 6 floodlight towers in 2006, enabling the hosting of day/night matches. In May 2006 it hosted the first ever international Day/Night ODI match in the Caribbean when the West Indies took on Zimbabwe. Due to the unfavourable time zone differences between the Caribbean and the large cricket markets in the far east international day/night matches have been few and far between.

The facility has 18 hospitality suites, a permanent seating capacity of 13,000 with bucket-type seating which can be increased to 20,000 for international matches. There are also two artificial pitches and two turfs for practice and warm-ups.

Ground statistics

Regional cricket
It serves as a home venue for the Windward Islands cricket team along with the Mindoo Philip Park in Castries.

International cricket
It has been a venue for all forms of cricket in the West Indies since 2003.

Cricket records

 First One Day International:  West Indies vs New Zealand on 8 June 2002.
 First Test match:  West Indies vs Sri Lanka on 20–24 June 2003.
Highest team score (in Tests)- India (588–8) vs West Indies in 2006.
Highest team total (in ODIs) – New Zealand( 363–5) vs Canada in 2007.
Highest team total (in T20Is) – Australia (197–7) vs Pakistan in 2010.
Best Bowling (in ODIs) – Rashid Khan (7/18) vs West Indies in 2017.
Hat-tricks (in Test) – Keshav Maharaj vs West Indies in 2021.

List of centuries

Test centuries
 a total of 18 centuries have been scored in international test cricket on the ground.

One-Day International centuries
 a total of seven centuries have been scored in one-day international cricket on the ground.

List of five wicket hauls

Tests
Twelve five wicket hauls in Test matches have been taken at the venue.

One Day Internationals
Three five wicket hauls in One-Day Internationals have been taken at the venue.

2007 Cricket World Cup
It was one of the venues of the 2007 Cricket World Cup, the most important tournament in international cricket, hosting 7 matches, including all 6 Group C matches. New Zealand went the round unbeaten, twice scoring a total beyond 300 runs. The second semi-final between the defending champions Australia and South Africa was played here with an official attendance of 13,875.

Group matches

Semi-final

2010 World Twenty20
In 2010, the stadium hosted 10 matches of the 2010 ICC World Twenty20 along with two other stadiums in Caribbean. Four of the matches were Group stage games, four Super 8 matches and both semi-finals of the tournament (one of the semi-finals due to bad weather preventing matches from being held at the Providence Stadium in Guyana).

The stadium saw the third international Twenty20 century scored by Indian batsman Suresh Raina in the Group match between India and South Africa.

Group matches

Super 8 matches

Semi-finals

See also
2007 Cricket World Cup
Windward Islands cricket team
List of Test cricket grounds

References

Test cricket grounds in the West Indies
Cricket grounds in Saint Lucia
Sports venues completed in 2002
2002 establishments in Saint Lucia
2007 Cricket World Cup stadiums